Allan Edmund Sullivan,  (June 23, 1932 – June 19, 1982) was a Canadian politician. He represented the electoral district of Cape Breton West in the Nova Scotia House of Assembly from 1970 to 1976. He was a member of the Nova Scotia Liberal Party.

Sullivan was born in New Glasgow, Nova Scotia. He attended Dalhousie University, earning a Bachelor of Laws degree in 1956. He was a lawyer and member of the Queen's Counsel. In 1956, he married Dawn Christina Simpson. He served in the Executive Council of Nova Scotia as Minister of Mines, Minister of Public Welfare, Minister of Education and Attorney General. He resigned his seat in 1976 when he was appointed a judge.
Sullivan died in Sydney in 1982.

References

1932 births
1982 deaths
Nova Scotia Liberal Party MLAs
Members of the Executive Council of Nova Scotia
People from the Cape Breton Regional Municipality
People from New Glasgow, Nova Scotia
Canadian King's Counsel